Maurice Celsus Daly (born 28 November 1955)  is an Irish former professional footballer who played twice for the Republic of Ireland. Both his international appearances came in April 1978 in friendlies against Poland and Turkey under the management of Johnny Giles.

He was also capped four times for the Republic of Ireland national under-21 football team.

He was a left sided defender or midfielder who in his club career played for Home Farm, Wolverhampton and IFK Västerås (not to be mixed up with Västerås SK).

Signed as a professional for Wolverhampton in July 1973, having joined the club as a 17-year-old from famed Dublin schoolboy club Home Farm, Daly spent five years at Wolverhampton before moving to Swedish second tier side IFK Västerås at the invitation of former Wolverhampton boss Sammy Chung.

Seven seasons later, he was appointed part-time coach of third division club Skultuna.

References

External links
 Profile from soccerscene.ie

Bibliography
 Dean Hayes, Ireland's Greatest (Appletree Press, 2006)  

1955 births
Republic of Ireland association footballers
Republic of Ireland international footballers
Republic of Ireland under-21 international footballers
Wolverhampton Wanderers F.C. players
Home Farm F.C. players
English Football League players
Living people
Association football defenders